Zetona is a genus of butterflies in the family Lycaenidae. The single member of this genus, Zetona delospila, the clear-spotted blue or satin blue, is found in Australia in the northern part of the state of Western Australia, the northern parts of the Northern Territory and Queensland.

The wingspan is about 20 mm. Adults are brown. Males have a purple tinge.

The larvae feed on Cassytha filiformis. They are green with brown hairs and a narrow red dorsal line edged in white and purple. The pupa is attached to a nearby plant or in a curled leaf on the ground.

References

Monotypic butterfly genera
Candalidini
Lycaenidae genera